Nationality words link to articles with information on the nation's poetry or literature (for instance, Irish or France).

Events
 c. April 8 – English poet Lascelles Abercrombie and his family move to live near Dymock in rural Gloucestershire, first of the Dymock poets
 c. August – Wilhelm Apollinaris de Kostrowitzky, who writes under the pen name "Guillaume Apollinaire", is suspected in the theft of the Mona Lisa from The Louvre museum in Paris and imprisoned for six days
 December 16 – The Copyright Act in the United Kingdom consolidates copyright law in the British Empire and confirms the six libraries in each of which a copy of every book published in the U.K. must be deposited by the publisher: the British Museum Library (London); the Bodleian Library (Oxford); the Advocates Library (Edinburgh); the National Library of Wales (Aberystwyth); Trinity College Dublin; and Cambridge University Library

Works published in English

Canada
 J. D. Logan, Songs of the Makers of Canada, and Other Homeland Lyrics
 Arthur Stringer, Irish Poems. New York: Mitchell Kennerley.

United Kingdom
 Rupert Brooke, Poems 1911
 G. K. Chesterton, The Ballad of the White Horse
 Elizabeth Daryush, Charitesse
 E. V. Knox, The Brazen Lyre
 Patrick MacGill, Songs of a Navvy
 John Masefield, The Everlasting Mercy 
 Harold Monro, Before Dawn (poems and impressions)
 Stephen Phillips, The New Inferno
 Ezra Pound, Canzoni, London; American author published in the United Kingdom
 Katharine Tynan, New Poems
 Anna Wickham, Songs of John Oland

United States
 Franklin P. Adams, Tobogganing on Parnassus
 Ezra Pound, Canzoni, London; American author published in the United Kingdom
 George Sterling, The House of Orchids
 Sara Teasdale, Helen of Troy

Other in English

 Victor Daley, Wine and Roses, posthumously published, Australia
 J. N. Gupta, The Life and Works of Romesh Chunder Dutt, (Dutt (1848–1920) is an Indian poet writing in English), published in New York and London this year

Works published in other languages

France
 Guillaume Apollinaire, pen name of Wilhelm Apollinaris de Kostrowitzky, Le Bestiaire ou Cortège d'Orphée, Paris: Deplanche; his first book of poetry (see also "Events" section, above)
 Paul Claudel:
 L'Otage, France
 Chemin de Croix
 Léon-Paul Fargue, Tancrède
 Francis Jammes, Les Géorgiques chrétiennes ("Christian Georgics"), three volumes, published from this year to 1912
 Oscar Vladislas de Lubicz-Milosz, also known as O. V. de L. Milosz, Les Éléments
 Saint-John Perse, Éloges, Paris: Editions de la Nouvelle Revue Française; France
 May Ziadeh, writing as  Isis Copia, Fleurs de rêve, Lebanese-Palestinian poet writing in French

Indian subcontinent
Including all of the British colonies that later became India, Pakistan, Bangladesh, Sri Lanka and Nepal. Listed alphabetically by first name, regardless of surname:
 Devendranath Sen, Indian, Bengali-language poet:
 Golap Guccha
 Sisu Mangal
 Apurba Naibedya
 Gurajada Appa Rao, Lavanaraju Kala, Telugu-language narrative poem written in a new, four-line stanzaic form (surname: Gurajada)
 S. G. Narasimhachar, Presita Priya Samagama translation from the original English of The Hermit by Oliver Goldsmith, Indian, Kannada language
 Tirupati Venkata Kavulu, Pandavodyoga Vijayam, Telugu-language verse drama based on the Mahabharatha tales (surname: Tirupathi)

Other languages
 Constantine P. Cavafy, Itaka and The Gods Abandon Antony, Greece
 José María Eguren, Simbólicas,, Peru
 Georg Heym, Der Krieg and Der ewige Tag, Germany
 Vicente Huidobro, Ecos del alma, Chile
 Else Lasker-Schüler, Meine Wunder, Germany

Awards and honors

United States
 American Academy of Arts and Letters Gold Medal for Poetry: James Whitcomb Riley
 Nobel Prize for Literature: Count Maurice (Mooris) Polidore Marie Bernhard Maeterlinck, Belgian poet, playwright, and essayist

Births
Death years link to the corresponding "[year] in poetry" article:
 January 1 – Audrey Wurdemann (died 1960), American poet, youngest winner of the Pulitzer Prize for Poetry
 January 7 – Faiz Ahmed Faiz (died 1984), Pakistani poet
 February 1 – Robert Gittings (died 1992), English writer, biographer, radio producer, playwright and poet
 February 8 – Elizabeth Bishop (died 1979), American poet, Pulitzer Prize winner
 February 13 – Faiz Ahmad Faiz (died 1984), Indian,  Urdu-language poet, teacher, army officer, journalist, trade unionist and broadcaster
 February 16 – Hal Porter (died 1984), Australian writer, novelist, playwright and poet
 February 28 – Amir Hamzah (died 1946), Indonesian poet styled a national hero
 March 1 – Ian Mudie (died 1976), Australian
 April 7 – Hervé Bazin, full name: Jean-Pierre Hervé-Bazin (died 1966), French novelist and poet
 May 2 – Ben Belitt (died 2003), American poet
 May 13 – N. V. Krishna Warrier (died 1989), Indian, Malayalam-language poet, critic and scholar who introduces new types of long narrative poems and satires; editor of weekly Mathrubhumi; director of Kerala Bhasa Institute
 May 29 – Leah Goldberg (died 1970), Israeli poet writing in Hebrew
 June 11 – Josephine Miles (died 1985), American poet and literary critic
 June 17 – Allen Curnow (died 2001), New Zealand poet
 June 20 – Sufia Kamal (died 1999), Bengali poet, writer, organizer, feminist and activist
 June 28 – Clem Christesen (died 2003), Australian poet, founding editor of Meanjin
 June 30 – Czesław Miłosz (died 2004), Polish poet, prose writer and translator.
 July 12 – Umashankar Joshi (died 1988), Indian, Gujarati-language novelist, poet, critic,  short-story writer, playwright, travel writer and academic
 July 19 – Mervyn Peake (died 1968), writer, artist, illustrator and poet
 August 25 – J. V. Cunningham (died 1985), American poet, literary critic and teacher
 September 3 – Ernst Meister (died 1979), German
 September 9
 Paul Goodman (died 1972), American poet
 Ale Ahmad Suroor (died 2002), Indian Urdu-language poet
 October 11 – Changampuzha Krishna Pillai (died 1948), Indian, Malayalam-language poet and translator
 October 13 – Millosh Gjergj Nikolla ('Migjeni') (died 1938), Albanian poet and writer
 October 26 – Sorley Maclean (died 1996), Scottish poet
 October 28 – Patrice de La Tour du Pin (died 1975), French
 November 2 – Odysseus Elytis (died 1996), Greek
 November 5 – Vailoppilli Sreedhara Menon (died 1985), Indian, Malayalam-language poet
 November 23 – William Hart-Smith (died 1990), Australian
 December 13 – Kenneth Patchen (died 1972) American poet and novelist
 Also:
 Robert Clark (died 2004), Indian-born Australian
 Sreedhara Menon, Vailoppillil (died 1985), Indian, Malayalam-language poet
 Samsher Bahadur Singh (died 1993), Indian, Hindi-language poet, essayist and artist
 Tenneti Suri (died in 1959), Indian, Telugu-language poet, novelist, translator and journalist

Deaths
Birth years link to the corresponding "[year] in poetry" article:
 January 15 – Carolina Coronado (born 1820), Spanish Romantic poet, member of Hermandad Lírica
 February 22 – Frances Harper (born 1825), African-American abolitionist, poet and author
 April 11 – Sir Alfred Comyn Lyall (born 1835), English civil servant, literary historian and poet
 May 29 – W. S. Gilbert (born 1836), English comic poet and librettist
 July 16 – Amelia Denis de Icaza (born 1836), Panamanian romantic poet in Nicaragua
 August 7 – Elizabeth Akers Allen (born 1832), American author, journalist and poet
 December 29 – Rosamund Marriott Watson, writing as Graham R. Tomson (born 1860), English poet
 Also:
 Jwala Prasad Barq (born 1863), Indian, Urdu-languagepoet and translator
 Eknath Ganesh Bhandare (born 1863), Indian, Marathi-language poet, translator and station-master
 Abdul Ahad Nadim (born 1840), Indian, Urdu-language poet, writer of "nats" (devotional lyrics addressed to the Prophet) in the traditional variety of the Kashmiri '"Vatsun"

See also

 Poetry
 List of years in poetry
 Silver Age of Russian Poetry
 Acmeist poetry movement in Russian poetry
 Dymock poets
 Ego-Futurism movement in Russian poetry
 Expressionism movement in German poetry
 Young Poland (Polish: Młoda Polska) modernist period in Polish  arts and literature

Notes

Poetry
20th-century poetry